Borna was the Duke of Croatia from  to 821 and vassal of the Frankish Empire. He resided in Nin and was the ruler of most of the Croats in northern Dalmatia.

Borna's predecessor was Višeslav of Croatia, probably his father. After his death in 821, he was succeeded by his nephew Vladislav.

He is mentioned in the Royal Frankish Annals (Annales regni Francorum) in entries regarding 818–821. His titles were "Duke of the Guduscani" (a Croatian tribe from Lika and northern Dalmatia) in 818; "Duke of Dalmatia" in 819; "Duke of Dalmatia and Liburnia" in 821. Historiography treats him as a ruler of Dalmatian Croatia.

History 

Borna is documented in the "Royal Frankish Annals" (Annales regni Francorum). He is first mentioned regarding an 818 meeting at Herstal of Frankish Emperor Louis the Pious with envoys of the Obotrites, Borna (duke of the Guduscani), and of the Timociani, who had recently revolted against the Bulgars and switched sides to the Franks, and also Ljudevit, duke of the Slavs in Lower Pannonia, the commander of the March of Friuli. Historiography predominantly treats the Guduscani as a tribe in Lika, along the river Gacka.

In July 819, another Frankish assembly was held at Ingelheim, and because of Ljudevit's rebellion against the Franks, Frankish troops were sent from Italy to Pannonia, but returned without accomplishment. Ljudevit sent envoys to the Franks with conditions that were not accepted by the Frankish emperor; Ljudevit continued the rebellion and sent envoys to neighbouring tribes to join him, managing to win over the Timociani who had initially submitted to the Franks. A small Frankish army clashed with Ljudevit's army in Carinthia, destroyed much of it and drove it out. Borna, now the "Duke of Dalmatia", with a large army met Ljudevit's advancing army on the Kupa river. The Guduscani deserted Borna at the first encounter, but he fled safely with his bodyguard. During this battle, Dragomuž (Dragomosus), Ljudevit's father-in-law who had joined Borna with the outbreak of the rebellion, fell. Borna conquered the Guduscani again after they had returned home. In December, Ljudevit used the opportunity to attack Dalmatia with a large army, ravaging the country. Borna attacked Ljudevit with crack troops, after storing as much as he could in his castles, seeing that he was no match for him. Worn down, attacked in the rear and flank, with heavy losses, Ljudevit was forced to retreat from Borna's territory. Ljudevit had 3,000 lost soldiers, and Borna seized more than 300 horses, and spoils of all kinds, then informed the Frankish emperor through his envoys of this.

In January 820 another Frankish assembly was held in Aachen. It was decided that Ljudevit's rebellion be quelled with three armies from three directions. Borna offered his opinions on the operation, first through envoys and then in person. In springtime, the three armies were dispatched, the first from Italy through the Noric Alps, the second through Carinthia, the third from Bavaria through Upper Pannonia. The first and third moved slowly, one hindered by enemies and the other by the long route, while the second crossed the Drava, successfully overcoming three enemy encounters, moving fast. The armies united and ravaged the land, and returned home without significant losses, while Ljudevit had stayed safe in a mountainous castle. Carniola, on the border with Friuli, and the Carinthians that had defected from the Franks to Ljudevit, surrendered to the Franks.

In February 821 another Frankish assembly was held in Aachen. War against Ljudevit was planned, with three armies to ravage lands of traitors. Meanwhile, Borna, now mentioned as the "Duke of Dalmatia and Liburnia", died, and was succeeded by his nephew (by his sister), Vladislav, by the people's will and emperor's approval. Ljudevit's lands were ravaged, the armies returning home by October.

Historiography
There are differing views over Borna's tribal belonging and regnal title in historiography.

A. K. Miošić (1801) called him a "Dalmatian king" (kragl Dalmatinski) and then "Slavic king" (kragl Slovinskii). A. Dimitz called him "Duke of the Dalmatian Slavs".

Croatian historiography treats him as a ruler of "Dalmatian Croatia": V. Klaić (1886) called him a "White Croatian duke" that later became the "Duke of Dalmatian Croats". F. Šišić (1920) deemed him a "Dalmatian-Croatian duke". A. P. Vlasto (1970) called him a "Dalmatian Croat" ruler, and believed he was at least nominally Christian. T. Macan (1971) called him a "duke of the southern Croatian duchy". I. Perić (1997) called him a "Croatian-Dalmatian duke". Similarly, Croatian historian Neven Budak also mentions him as "first known Croatian duke".

R. Novaković (1973) does not support that he was a duke of Dalmatian Croatia, as no contemporary sources name him as such. According to him, Borna could only be the duke of that area that was at the time under Frankish supreme rule, and that he was active only in the area included in the rebellion against Frankish rule, that is, only west of the Una river. It is possible that Borna was the duke of an archonty not yet part of Croatia in the beginning of the 9th century, neither was Croatia at all included in the events of Ljudevit's rebellion. The war was fought only in the area under Frankish rule, while Dalmatian Croatia was outside those events, as it at that time was under Byzantine supreme rule. M. Atlagić and B. Milutinović (2002) treat him as a Dalmatian Slavic ruler. Another view is that it seems that after the Timociani did not receive aid, a part of them settled in Slavonia, it seems also that Borna moved with them; S. Prvanović (1962) viewed him as a duke from Timok-Kučevo that founded the first Croatian state, while M. S. Milojević (1872) treated him as a Frankish vassal in "Littoral Croatia" that originally held three counties in the Timok region. Prvanović claimed that F. Racki had falsified the RFA, that Borna actually was the duke of Guduscani and Timociani, combined, and that Racki had put a comma after Guduscani, based on the identification with Gacka in Lika and presumption that due to the geographical distance between the two meant that the two could not have had nearer contact nor a joint duke. Prvanović was not the first to put the Guduscani in the Timok region; 19th-century P. J. Šafárik and V. Karić located them around the Timok and Danube.

Fine Jr. first (1983, 1991) called him a ruler of "Dalmatian Croatia", in c. 810–821, having succeeded Višeslav and "who resided at Nin and seems to have been the ruler of most of the Croatians in northern Dalmatia, was also a Frankish Vassal." then (2010) called him simply a Slavic prince, and also noted that the Franks did not use the term "Croats", suggesting that those usually called Croats in scholarship did not actually use that name. B. W. Scholz (1970) uses the original titles found in the primary source, and in the index uses "duke of Dalmatia". R. McKitterick (1983) called him a "leader of the Dalmatian Croats". C. R. Bowlus (1995) treated him as the "dux of the Guduscani and Timocian Slavs" and a "Dalmatian prince". F. Curta (2006) treats him as a Slavic ruler, of the Guduscani, a Slavic tribe in the Gacka region (modern Croatia). Garipzanov, Geary and Urbańczyk (2008) call him "Duke of Dalmatia and Liburnia".

Identification with other rulers 
Marquart, in Osteuropäische u. ostasiatische Streifzöge (1903), identified De Administrando Imperio's Porinos and Porga with Borna. Krumbacher (1906) supported that Porinos and Borna were the same, but not Porga. However, on the mere basis of the chronology of arrival and baptism in the 7th century, as well the non-Slavic origin of personal names of early Croatian rulers in the 7th century, Porga could not be Borna or Branimir (r. 879–892), with whom some scholars tried to identify him with.

Titles 
In the Royal Frankish Annals Borna is named "Duke of the Guduscani" in 818. In 819 he is the "Duke of Dalmatia", while in 821 he is the "Duke of Dalmatia and Liburnia".

The gradual ascent of his title should be due to his growing importance during the Frankish conflict with Ljudevit.

References

Sources

 
 
 
 
 
 
 
 
 
 

Dukes of Croatia
9th-century Croatian people
9th-century rulers in Europe
Christian monarchs
People from the Carolingian Empire
History of Dalmatia
History of Lika
Year of birth unknown
821 deaths
9th-century Slavs
Slavic warriors